Dar Al-Fouad is a hospital in Giza, Egypt, on the outskirts of Cairo. It offers cardiothoracic surgery, cardiology, oncology, organ transplant, and orthopedic departments.

Dar Al Fouad Hospital (DAFH) provides medical and surgical care to patients. DAFH also collaborates with medical institutions, such as the American Cleveland Clinic.

DAFH's top medical care and hospital management was recently granted accreditation by the Joint Commission International (JCI). The hospital was founded in 1999.

Projects
Dar Al Fouad is rapidly expanding throughout the region in order to serve additional communities. Projects are underway in Egypt (Nasr City), Kuwait, Saudi Arabia (Jeddah, Riyadh), Libya, Sudan, Oman, Abu Dhabi and Bahrain. In addition, Dar Al Fouad is conducting a feasibility study on the development of a nursing college in Egypt.

See also
List of hospitals in Egypt

External links
Dar Al Fouad Hospital
 

Hospital buildings completed in 1999
Hospitals in Egypt
Buildings and structures in Giza
Hospitals in Giza
20th-century architecture in Egypt